Rich Vos  is an American stand-up comedian, writer and actor. Since 2011, he has been the co-host of the podcast My Wife Hates Me with his wife, comedian Bonnie McFarlane.

Early life
Vos was raised in a Jewish family who lived in an "all black neighborhood" in New Jersey. Vos's parents divorced when he was young and he did not graduate from high school. He became a fan of stand-up comedy from watching television as a child and cites acts featured on The Ed Sullivan Show as a big influence.

Career

Vos began his stand-up career in 1984, choosing to pursue it full-time as he "failed at everything else", and developed his act in local clubs. In 1995, Vos became the first white comic to perform a set on Def Comedy Jam on HBO, a show usually featuring African American comedians. In July 1999, Vos hosted at the Woodstock '99 festival, later calling it a highlight of his career. In 2000, Vos received the Bistro Award for Outstanding Achievement as Comedy Performer. In 2001, Vos played the bouncer and wrote and performed skits on the British television show The People vs. Jerry Sadowitz.

In 2001, Vos released his first stand-up comedy album, I'm Killing Here. This was followed by the DVD Vos in 2004, consisting of an unedited, 55-minute performance recorded at the Stress Factory in New Jersey. He went on to produce two half-hour specials on Comedy Central Presents.

From 2002 to 2004, Vos was a frequent guest on Tough Crowd with Colin Quinn on Comedy Central. He picked the show as one of his favourites to do as he lived close to its filming location and by the fact that he could do it with his best friends. In 2003, Vos finished third on the first season of Last Comic Standing on NBC. During this time he was given the nickname "The Don" by Cory Kahaney "because of my rough and tough demeanor ... maybe it was more because I was the most experienced comic". At the end of the season, Vos toured with Kahaney and Dave Mordal for eight months. In 2004, Vos was a finalist in its third season.

Vos was a frequent guest on the Opie and Anthony radio show, with jokes centered at his expense, most often highlighting his speech impediment or lack of intellect. In 2002, he was responsible for having fellow comedian Patrice O'Neal come on the show, who also became a popular regular guest. When the show aired on SiriusXM Radio, Vos hosted a Saturday night program with his wife Bonnie McFarlane. He hosted the 2006 and 2007 editions of the Opie and Anthony's Traveling Virus Comedy Tour.

Between 2006 and 2008, Vos prepared three pilot episodes for a comedy series alongside McFarlane, but neither were picked up by a network.

He was featured in a segment of the television show, What Would You Do?.

In November 2011, Vos and McFarlane started their own podcast, My Wife Hates Me.

In 2016, Vos released his fifth comedy album V, of which its material took between one year and a half and two years to develop. It charted at number one on the iTunes and Billboard release charts.

In 2022, while performing at a comedy club in Winnipeg, Manitoba, Vos made racist comments about members of the audience based on their Indigenous ethnicity. After several Indigenous members of the audience walked out, Vos reportedly  said "They should all go back to their f——— wigwam," at which point more audience members walked out. He also reportedly used the word "gay" in a derogatory sense during his set.

Personal life 
After struggling with crack cocaine and alcohol addiction throughout his 20s, Vos completed a one-month rehabilitation course in 1987, three years into his comedy career. He has been clean since.

Vos has married twice; he and his first wife have two daughters, Jessica and Ellen, before they divorced. In September 2005, Vos married comedian Bonnie McFarlane. Their daughter Rayna was born in 2007. Vos lives in Hillsborough Township, New Jersey to be closer to his children.

Stand-up releases 
 I'm Killing Here! (2001)
 Vos (2004)
 Vos: Live in Philly (2010)
 Still Empty Inside (2011)
 141 IQ (2016)
 V (2016)
 When I Saw Hamilton... (2019)

References

External links
RichVos.com

Living people
People from Hillsborough Township, New Jersey
Jewish American male actors
American podcasters
American stand-up comedians
Last Comic Standing contestants
Male actors from New York City
American humorists
American radio personalities
Comedians from New York City
Jewish American comedians
20th-century American comedians
21st-century American comedians
21st-century American Jews
Year of birth missing (living people)